Robert Leroy Hunskor  (born November 2, 1932) is an American politician in the state of North Dakota. He is a member of the North Dakota House of Representatives, representing the 6th district. A Democrat, he was first elected in 2000. He is an alumnus of Minot State College and former public school employee and coach in Newburg, North Dakota. He also served in the United States Army from 1954–56.

References

1932 births
Living people
Place of birth missing (living people)
United States Army personnel
21st-century American politicians
Minot State University alumni
Democratic Party members of the North Dakota House of Representatives